Hemsworth is a town and civil parish on the edge of West Yorkshire, England.

Hemsworth may also refer to:

Places
 Hemsworth (UK Parliament constituency), parliamentary constituency in West Yorkshire, represented in the House of Commons
 Hemsworth Rural District, from 1894 to 1974 a rural district in the West Riding of Yorkshire, England
 Hemsworth, Sheffield, suburb in Gleadless Valley, City of Sheffield, England

Other uses
 Hemsworth (surname)